Doctor Ivo "Eggman" Robotnik is the main antagonist of Sega's Sonic the Hedgehog franchise. Eggman was created and designed by Naoto Ohshima as part of many design choices for Sega's new mascot. After the creation of Sonic the Hedgehog, Ohshima chose to use his previous egg-shaped character to create the antagonist of the 1991 video game Sonic the Hedgehog, making him the arch-nemesis of the series' eponymous main character.

In the main line of video games, Eggman is a dastardly mad scientist who plans to conquer the world to build his own empire. While he has gone through several major and minor appearance changes throughout the series, his in-game designs retain several basic characteristics, such as his ovate body, red-black-yellow clothing, bald head, a onesie, pince-nez sunglasses, and large mustache. Eggman commonly creates machines and robots, including a wide variety of Badniks. Notably in early games, he has also served as a recurring boss, appearing in almost every level piloting one of his created vehicles.

Eggman has appeared in almost every Sonic the Hedgehog video game since his first appearance in the 1991 title Sonic the Hedgehog and is also a prominent character in other media, including comics, novels, and cartoons. He made his live-action cinematic debut in the 2020 film adaptation, portrayed by Jim Carrey. Eggman has been well-received by critics and is one of the most popular and recognizable villains in gaming history.

Conception and creation

In 1990, Sega president Hayao Nakayama sought a flagship series to compete with Nintendo's Mario franchise, along with a character to serve as a company mascot. Several character designs were submitted as part of a contest. Among the designs was an egg-shaped human wearing pajamas who resembled U.S. president Theodore Roosevelt, drawn by Naoto Ohshima. According to Ohshima, the resemblance to Roosevelt was unintentional, saying he was influenced by a variety of characters. Retrospective sources have indicated Ohshima based the character on Humpty Dumpty and Mario. The Roosevelt lookalike did not win the contest; rather, another Ohshima character, a hedgehog named Sonic—prevailed.

As development of the Sega Genesis game Sonic the Hedgehog progressed, however, programmer Yuji Naka and the rest of Sonic Team thought the rejected design was excellent and deserved inclusion in the game. Since the character could not be the protagonist, the team retooled him into the game's main antagonist. In developing Eggman, Sonic Team characterized him as Sonic's opposite. Eggman was designed to represent themes of "machinery" and "development" to play on the then-growing debate between developers and environmentalists, and as a symbol for humanity who views nature as dirty, and roads and buildings as clean. The character was also designed to be easy for children to draw.

Naming
The character was always named Doctor Eggman in Japan, but Sega of America changed his name to Doctor Ivo Robotnik when localizing Sonic the Hedgehog. In a 2016 interview with Game Informer, Takashi Iizuka revealed Sega of America did this without consulting the development team:

The English instruction manual for his debut game Sonic the Hedgehog described the character's full name as "Doctor Ivo Robotnik", while the Japanese version's instruction manual for the same game called him "Doctor Eggman". It was not until 1999's Sonic Adventure that the character was called both "Eggman" and "Robotnik" in the English version, with all following English releases to date referring to him as "Doctor Eggman". Yuji Naka has explained that "Robotnik" is the character's true last name while "Eggman" is a nickname taken after his shape. Since then, English language sources have listed his identity as Doctor Ivo "Eggman" Robotnik at least once, and has recognized both the first name Ivo and the last name Robotnik as recently as 2016 in the video games and 2015 in social media, with Sonic Frontiers establishing his acceptance of the name "Eggman" as a way to defy Sonic's mockery of him.

Although Eggman's true name was given as Robotnik in an eyecatch card in the Japanese version of the animated series Sonic X, Eggman's in-game profile in the Japanese version of Sonic the Hedgehog 4: Episode II lists his real name as a mystery. The name "Robotnik" has appeared in official Japanese media as the surname of two other characters, both featured in Sonic Adventure 2 and Sonic X and both relatives of Eggman: Eggman's cousin, Maria Robotnik and their grandfather Gerald Robotnik.

Voice actors and portrayers
Several voice actors have portrayed Eggman/Robotnik in his game appearances. His first voice actor was Masaharu Satō, who portrayed him in a handful of arcade games such as SegaSonic the Hedgehog. In the Japanese game releases from 1998 to 2015, Eggman was voiced by Chikao Ōtsuka. Kotaro Nakamura assumed the role following Ōtsuka's death in January 2015, beginning with Mario & Sonic at the Rio 2016 Olympic Games.

In animation, he was voiced by Long John Baldry in Adventures of Sonic the Hedgehog, Jim Cummings in Sonic the Hedgehog (where he also voiced the character in Adventures of Sonic the Hedgehogs unaired pilot), Edwin Neal in Sonic the Hedgehog: The Movie and Garry Chalk in Sonic Underground, and Brian Drummond in Sonic Prime.

Deem Bristow was the first English-language actor to portray Eggman in a video game, debuting in Sonic Adventure for the Sega Dreamcast. He went on to voice him in further games of the series, with his last performance in Sonic Advance 3 before his death in early 2005. Mike Pollock, who first voiced Eggman in the English dub of Sonic X, succeeded Bristow in the games, beginning with Shadow the Hedgehog and Sonic Rush in 2005. While it was announced that the rest of the cast would be replaced from Sonic Free Riders onward in 2010, Pollock retained his role, making him the longest-serving voice actor to portray the character in any language. 

Jim Carrey was the first to portray Eggman in live-action film, beginning with Sonic the Hedgehog in 2020. He reprised the role in the 2022 sequel.

Characteristics

Eggman's original design portrayed the character as a bald, rotund human wearing pince-nez sunglasses, a red flight suit with a yellow collar, a bushy mustache, and black pants with two white buttons. This rotund design was influenced by Ohshima's hope he would be easy for children to draw; Eggman was also based on people Ohshima considered "nerdy, socially awkward, tinker-type with glasses, a mustache and a fat belly". Sonic Team's Yuji Uekawa redesigned Eggman and other series characters for Sonic Adventure in 1998. Eggman's updated design adds goggles to his head and gives him a detailed red lab coat. For the 2006 Sonic the Hedgehog game, Eggman was redesigned further, being made slimmer and more realistic to better suit the game's updated environment.

Eggman is described as a certifiable genius with an IQ of 300. His fondness for machines has also made him a renowned authority on robotics. Ultimately, his goal is to conquer the world and create his ultimate "utopia", the Eggman Empire (alternatively known as the Robotnik Empire, Eggmanland, Robotnikland, or Robotropolis). He selfishly never gives up on this matter and does not care for others' opinions. He considers those who would interrupt his plans a prime threat. His abominable laughter and maniacal declarations contrast his self-professed softer side, describing himself as a romanticist, and gentleman. Although Sonic has always ruined his evil plans, Eggman begrudgingly holds a secret respect for his determination. Additionally, while he is normally enemies with Sonic and his friends, Eggman has worked alongside them to combat greater threats such as when he works to stop the Space Colony ARK from crashing into the Earth in Sonic Adventure 2 or against rival villains such as the Marauders in Sonic Chronicles: The Dark Brotherhood, though after these threats have been neutralized Eggman returns to being an enemy of Sonic.

Appearances

Main series
Robotnik/Eggman has served as the main antagonist in the majority of video games set in the Sonic the Hedgehog universe. Most of the Sonic games released before Sonic Adventure featured him as the final boss that the player fights at the end of the game. Robotnik also appears as a boss who the player must confront at the end of almost every level in most of the 2D Sonic games, and in Sonic 3D Blast. In each game in which he makes multiple appearances as a boss, Eggman fights the player using a different machine each time he appears. In most of the 2D Sonic games, the player had to hit Robotnik eight times in order to defeat him and move on to the next level, or next boss. In most 3D Sonic games since the release of Sonic Adventure in 1998, Eggman may serve as a boss at one or more points in the game, although he usually does not serve as the final boss. Many of the final bosses in these more recent Sonic games were former allies of Eggman who then betrayed him, while others were a third party that had no connection with Eggman whatsoever. Eggman has often formed temporary alliances with Sonic and others to help them defeat these more formidable foes.

Classic universe
Dr. Eggman (referred to by his full name Dr. Ivo Robotnik in the Western instruction manual) debuted in the 1991 Sega Genesis platform game Sonic the Hedgehog, where he attempts to steal six of the seven Chaos Emeralds and hoped to turn all of the helpless animals inhabiting South Island into robots under his control. Sonic manages to defeat Robotnik and returns peace to South Island.

Robotnik, along with his latest creation, Metal Sonic, travels to Little Planet, a mysterious planetoid that appears above Forever Lake annually for one every year, in search of magical gems called Time Stones that have the power to control the passage of time in Sonic CD. While following the doctor once again to stop his schemes, Sonic is followed by Amy Rose, a pink female hedgehog who has a crush on him, only for Metal Sonic to kidnap her. Fighting Robotnik in his war machines and recovering the Time Stones while preventing Robotnik from conquering each Zone through back-and-forth time traveling, Sonic confronts Metal Sonic in Stardust Speedway in a race while Robotnik destroys the path behind them. Sonic beats Metal in the race, leaving his robotic doppelganger to slam into a wall and rescues Amy. Sonic and Robotnik once again showdown in Metallic Madness, Sonic again defeating him and escaping with Amy. In the bad ending, Robotnik is seen flying away with a Time Stone, but is shot down by a rock thrown by Sonic, but a time paradox reverts the Little Planet back to it's mechanized state. In the good ending, the Little Planet is restored and released, disappearing again while emitting an image of Sonic's face in thanks.

Robotnik returned in Sonic the Hedgehog 2, where he once again sought the Chaos Emeralds (soon finding out that there's seven, rather than six) to create the Death Egg, a huge, orbital space station that bears his appearance, in order to achieve world domination. He attacked West Side Island, turning its animals into robots. He was intercepted by Sonic and his new friend Miles "Tails" Prower, who saved the animals and retrieved the Chaos Emeralds before the evil scientist. Sonic raided the Death Egg, first fighting a robotic doppelganger of himself dubbed Mecha Sonic before fighting Robotnik again in a mechanical battlesuit in the doctor's likeness. Defeating him once again and sending the Death Egg crashing back to the world.

Following the events of Sonic 2, the Death Egg crash-lands onto Angel Island, causing critical damage to the ship. While repairing the space station, Robotnik meets Knuckles the Echidna, who he tricks into thinking Sonic and Tails are villains after the powerful Master Emerald that Knuckles protects with his life in Sonic 3. Knuckles steals the Chaos Emeralds from Sonic and constantly interferes with Sonic's fight. Robotnik is able to launch the Death Egg, but it fails to get into orbit before Sonic sends it crashing back down into the Lava Reef Zone.

Robotnik later reveals his true plan to Knuckles after stealing the Master Emerald during a fight between Sonic and Knuckles and gets the Death Egg into space once again in Sonic & Knuckles. With help from Knuckles, who has become an ally, Sonic is able to chase the madman into space and completely destroy the Death Egg. Robotnik makes one last chance to escape with the Master Emerald, but Super/Hyper Sonic defeats him. Meanwhile, following this, an EggRobo, a Badnik designed in his likeness who survived the destruction of the Death Egg, is programmed by Robotnik to menace Knuckles in revenge for the echidna's role in his defeat as a contingency plan. The EggRobo lures Knuckles' through Angel Island's zones in rebuilt war machines before leading him to an empty peninsula of Sky Sanctuary Zone, revealing that Mecha Sonic mk.2, a stronger robotic duplicate of Sonic, had stolen the Master Emerald once more while the EggRobo kept him distracted. Destroying the EggRobo, Knuckles battles Mecha Sonic, who even using the Master Emerald's power to achieve a Super Mode, is defeated and destroyed by Knuckles, who recovers the Master Emerald and is given a lift back to Angel Island by Sonic in the Tornado.

In Sonic Mania, Classic Eggman detects a signal on Angel Island, revealed to be a gem with mysterious reality-warping powers, the Phantom Ruby. Eggman's elite Eggrobo squad, the Hard Boiled Heavies, is mutated by it and transports Team Sonic to zones they visited in the past. Eggman uses the Phantom Ruby to once again turn the Little Planet from Sonic CD into a high tech base via time travel once more, but Team Sonic catches up with him and destroy his creation. If all 7 Emeralds are gathered, the Heavy King will try to take the gem from his creator in a interdimensional void, but Super Sonic takes it away from them and is sucked in a portal along with it.

Diverting his attention from Sonic or Tails, Robotnik builds an new and upgraded Metal Sonic and locates a new island that surfaced due to the Master Emerald's power, which holds a group of power rings with nigh-identical power to the Chaos Emeralds, dubbed Chaos Rings, in Knuckles' Chaotix. On this Isolated Island, Robotnik endeavors to use the Chaos Rings to forge corrupted Dark Rings and builds a "hub" zone called the Newtrogic High Zone that opens conduits to the island's Zones. Knuckles the Echidna also ventures to the island, hoping to find answers of his unknown heritage, discovers Robotnik's schemes and aims to stop him, joined by a group of detectives known as the Chaotix, consisting of Vector the Crocodile, Espio the Chameleon, and Charmy Bee, alongside two friendly robots called Heavy and Bomb. Working together, Knuckles and the Chaotix use specialized power rings to tether themselves to better work in tandem, collecting the Chaos Rings scattered throughout the Isolated Island, culminating in a battle with Metal Sonic, who Robotnik empowers with the Dark Ring into a hulking beastial red form dubbed Metal Sonic Kai. The heroes manage to destroy the monstrous robot and free the island from Robotnik's control, who retreats once more.

Robotnik learns of an island home to a species of bird known as Flickies, who utilize Warp Ring technologies, and Flicky Island currently hosts the Chaos Emeralds in Sonic 3D Blast. Planning to capture the entire population of Flickies and roboticize them into a new army, Robotnik and Sonic once again come to blows with Sonic, who traverses the island freeing the Flickies and collects the Chaos Emeralds, eventually defeating Robotnik yet again and drives the mad doctor off the island.

Robotnik later captures Sonic and traps him in a specially built trap-laden labyrinth, making it more challenging to escape by forcing a pair of special sneakers he made to nullify Sonic's speed on the hedgehog in Sonic Labyrinth. Despite this, Sonic successfully traverses the labyrinth and gets his real shoes back, with Robotnik retreating.

Robotnik, once again pursuing the Emeralds, manages to trick Knuckles into working together with him turning on Sonic and Tails again, also enlisting the help of a bounty hunter named Nack the Weasel (Fang the Sniper in Japan and Europe) in Sonic Triple Trouble, with Sonic and Tails combating both Knuckles, Nack, and a recovered and rebuilt Metal Sonic, before the duo convince Knuckles of the mad doctor's treachery and they battle and defeat him once more.

Robotnik rebuilds a smaller Death Egg and challenges Sonic, Tails, Knuckles, Amy, alongside Nack and his two cronies Bean the Dynamite and Bark the Polar Bear, as well as Espio and independent contender Honey the Cat, to an arranged tournament to stop him from destroying landmarks throughout Mobius with the Death Egg's arsenal in Sonic the Fighters. Sonic manages to defeat all opponents and ascends to the Death Egg II to fight Metal Sonic and then Robotnik in a walking melee-modified Eggmobile, managing to defeat him once more and destroy the space station.

Modern universe
In Sonic the Hedgehog 4: Episode I (set after Sonic 3 & Knuckles), Sonic goes traveling on his own, not knowing Eggman survived the destruction of the Death Egg. The doctor remakes his old badniks, and improves them to destroy his old rival once and for all. Eggman is the main boss in this game and its direct follow-up, Sonic the Hedgehog 4: Episode II where he revives Metal Sonic and encases the Little Planet in a Death Egg with Sonic and Tails setting out to stop him.

Robotnik later learns of a legendary monster trapped in the Master Emerald named Chaos, and seeks out the ancient gemstone out. Upon finding it, he shatters it, freeing Chaos in the process. Robotnik's goal is to control Chaos and obtain the Chaos Emeralds, which he can feed to Chaos so that it transforms into its most powerful form, using its destructive powers to destroy the fictitious city of Station Square in order to build his own "Robotnikland". However, Chaos turns against him and intends to collect the Chaos Emeralds for itself. Towards the end, Robotnik teams up with the heroes to defeat Chaos. Like other characters in the series, Robotnik was redesigned for this game; here he calls himself "Robotnik", with Sonic and friends calling him "Eggman" as a nickname.

Sonic Adventure 2 marks the doctor's first appearance as a playable character, as well as the first game where he is primarily referred to (and refers to himself) as "Eggman" in all regions. Eggman revives the antihero Shadow the Hedgehog from dormancy. Shadow, knowing Eggman's desire to rule the world, agrees to help him by using the Eclipse Cannon aboard Space Colony ARK. In the last story, Eggman aids Sonic in trying to stop a fail-safe put in place by his grandfather, Prof. Gerald Robotnik, which set the colony on a crash course with Earth.

Afterwards, Eggman creates a series of battleships called the Egg Fleet, which he plans to use to take over the world in 3 days in Sonic Heroes. He is once again the main antagonist, but it is discovered that he was betrayed and captured by his own creation Metal Sonic, who disguised himself as Eggman, and had taken control of the Egg Fleet for his own plan for world domination.

Eggman is an opportunist who tries to gather the Chaos Emeralds in the middle of the Black Arms' invasion of Earth in Shadow the Hedgehog. He is an ally or an enemy of Shadow during his missions. He ends up sending his robots to help stop the alien menace in the end. As Shadow interrogates Eggman for information regarding his past, he is met with taunts from Eggman, who claims that Shadow is one of his androids. In some of the game's possible endings, Shadow accepts being an android and kills Eggman. However, in the Last Story during Shadow's final fight with Black Doom, Eggman admits that he was lying about everything he said about Shadow; he had used one of his robots to rescue Shadow from his apparent death, despite not giving further explanation how Shadow lost his memories.

Eggman kidnaps Princess Elise of Soleanna, who harbors the Flames of Disaster within her, in order to control time in the 2006 game of Sonic the Hedgehog, serving as the main antagonist of Sonic's story, while Mephiles the Dark and Iblis the Inferno serve as the villains of Shadow's and Silver's stories respectively, before the latter two villains use the Chaos Emeralds to re-merge into their true form Solaris, Soleanna's vengeful patron deity who seeks recompense for being experimented on by the Duke of Soleanna, Elise's father, and the time-traveling Shadow and Silver. Once again, he is forced to assist the heroes during the last act, much like previous games. In this game, he was given a realistic human appearance; this new look for Eggman has not been used since, as his physical appearance was back to what it looked like in Sonic Adventure in his later appearances.

Eggman, along with Dark Gaia, is one of the main antagonists in Sonic Unleashed. Eggman tricks Super Sonic into a trap and uses his Chaos Emerald energy to power a gigantic laser cannon, which fires into the Earth and shatters it into pieces, freeing the beast contained within: Dark Gaia. He spends most of the game collecting Dark Gaia's power as well as fighting Sonic with various machines, and much like the original games, flies off in his Egg Mobile when defeated. Unlike many previous games, Eggman actually assumes control of his plans at the end of Sonic Unleashed by creating Eggmanland and makes no effort to join forces with Sonic to stop his own plans once they have spiraled out of control. Still, Eggman suffers a defeat when he gives Dark Gaia a single order and is shot into the atmosphere by the creature. He is last seen having crashed in the Shamaran Desert, mocked by his robot assistant SA-55 over his failure, only to chase it down in a rage. 

In Sonic Colors, Eggman is again the main antagonist. While at the behinning claims to be seeking forgiveness for his past transgressions, and attempts to make amends by opening up a interstellar theme park, chaining together several planets to be used as attractions within planet's orbit. However, it becomes clear that the park is merely a front for Eggman's true intentions, which involve harnessing the energies of the alien Wisps for his own use; specifically, a mind-control cannon hidden in the central hub of the park which he plans to use to take over the universe. Unlike most 3D Sonic games, Eggman is the final boss, piloting an Eggmobile protected by the Nega-Wisp Armor/Egg Nega-Wisp, utilizing corrupted weaponized versions of the Wisps' powers. After his defeat, he ends up being sucked into his theme park which has transformed into a black hole when the negative energy backfires, consuming the entire park. After the credits, Eggman is seen stranded out in deep space inside the Eggmobile along with his two robot assistants Orbot and Cubot stating he has his revenge plan laid out.

Eggman appears in both his classic and modern designs where in a plot twist it is discovered that he is the main antagonist of the game in Sonic Generations. After his defeat in Sonic Colors, while stranded in space, Eggman came across a being known as the Time Eater; after somehow converting it into robotic form, he attempts to use its time powers to reverse all of his past defeats at the hands of Sonic. By using the Time Eater, however, he causes rifts in time to open, bringing Sonic, Tails and himself to meet their classic counterparts. Eggman works together with his past self, Classic Eggman, to attempt to vanquish Sonic once and for all. They serve as the Classic Era, the Modern Era, and the final bosses during the game. Each fights with a different mech: Classic Eggman with the Death Egg Robot from Sonic 2/in the handheld version, he used the Big Arm mech from Sonic 3, Modern Eggman with a redesigned Egg Dragoon from Sonic Unleashed/in the handheld version, he used the Egg Emperor from Sonic Heroes, and together with the Time Eater. Unfortunately for the duo, the Time Eater is defeated when both Classic and Modern Sonic become Super Sonic. In the post-credits scene, both doctors wind up stranded in White Space with no apparent way out, leading Classic Eggman to suggest obtaining their teaching degrees once they escape. Modern Eggman agrees to this as he mentions that he "always enjoyed telling people what to do", although it is unknown if this was a joke or they were serious. Eventually, both Classic and Modern Eggman manage to escape White Space and return to their own time periods.

Eggman travels to a floating planetoid called the Lost Hex (similar to the Little Planet), as part of a scheme to use an energy extractor to harness some of the world's energy in Sonic Lost World. Along the way, he takes control of the Deadly Six, a band of villainous Zeti, natives of the Lost Hex, using a Cacophonic Conch to torture them into subservience . When Sonic hastily knocks away the conch, the Deadly Six betray him by using their ability to manipulate magnetic fields to turn Eggman's robots against him. With this turn of events, he is forced to work together with Sonic and Tails, as the Deadly Six plan to use his extractor to drain all of the world's energy to increase their power. However, in the final stage, Eggman ultimately overshadows the antagonistic role of the Deadly Six and is fought as the final boss of the game, by using the energy gathered by the extractor to power a giant mech, so he can rule whatever remained of the desiccated world. After Sonic defeated him, when Eggman tried to retreat, he found that his jetpack was sabotaged by Sonic, and thus falls to Mobius. In the post-credits cutscene, Eggman was shown to have survived his fall by landing on a soft spot of dirt. His servants Orbot and Cubot dig him out, but not before a rabbit chews off half of his mustache.

In Sonic Forces, after the Phantom Ruby ends up in the modern univers after the events of Sonic Mania, Eggman captures a jackal bandit known as the Ultimate Mercenary and his team, who tried to raid his base and turns him into the new villain Infinite, imbued by a prototype he created from Phantom Ruby. Eggman uses the illusions created by his most recent ally to create mass destruction and scare the planet's population into submission. While waging war against a resistance militia lead by Sonic's friends, he manages to defeat Sonic with Infinite's powers, creating false duplicates of previous rivals (namely Shadow, Metal Sonic, Chaos, and Zavok) and keep him as a prisoner. Sonic breaks free with the help of a new recruit of the resistance (the game's custom character) and rejoins with his friends six months later, forming a coalition to overthrow Eggman's rule, once again joined by Classic Sonic. When the two Sonics and the rookie confront Eggman and Infinite, the villains attempt to imprison them within Null Space with the Phantom Ruby, only for the two hedgehogs to escape and confront Infinite for the last time. After defeating him, Infinite is seemingly vaporized, taking the Phantom Ruby for himself to power a new war mech, only to once again be defeated by Sonic, Classic Sonic, and the rookie, destroying his mech and the Phantom Ruby for good and breaking the Eggman Empire's hold on the world.

In Sonic Frontiers, Eggman is engaging Amy Rose in a battle mech, with Sonic and Tails arriving to help her out. After destroying the mech,the trio realize the pilot was a robot decoy, meant to keep them distracted from Eggman's true goal, having learned of a mysterious new archipelago known as the Starfall Islands, home to immensely advanced technologies created by the Ancients who once inhabited them, the aliens who settled on the planet in the distant past and the creators of the Chaos Emeralds. Locating an Ancient portal spire in a ruined forest temple, Eggman uses his new A.I. assistant to activate it, only to provoke a force of Ancient Robots to attack him, with his A.I. using the portal spire to pull him into Cyber Space as a means of keeping him safe. Within Cyber Space, the A.I. takes form a holographic young girl, whom he dubs Sage. Eggman tasks Sage with finding a way out of the digital realm while he explores. However, while doing so, Sage also takes it upon herself to dissuade Sonic from freeing his friends, whom she imprisoned after they all arrived on the Starfall Islands, as she is aware of unknown but devastating consequences that would result from his mission. Throughout the journey, Sage slowly becomes influenced by Sonic's compassion and loyalty to his friends and the world as a whole. As such, Sage develops an affectionate regard for Eggman, coming to address him as "father", whom, surprisingly enough, reciprocates, in turn regarding her as his "daughter". Despite her efforts to galvanize the Titans, the Ancients' guardian robots who protect the Chaos Emeralds, against the heroic hedgehog, Super Sonic is able to destroy all three and free Tails, Amy, and Knuckles, but in doing so, releases a malevolent cosmic entity known only as the End, who had destroyed the Ancients' homeworld centuries ago, but was defeated by the four leaders of the beings and was imprisoned in Cyber Space, but managed to manipulate Sonic into freeing it. Sonic suffers a terminal corruption of the cyber energy running through him as Amy, Tails, Knuckles, and Eggman are released from Cyber Space, with Eggman gloating at his nemesis' apparent demise. However, unwilling to leave him to his fate, Tails, Amy, and Knuckles sacrifice their freedom to restore Sonic to normal, and with Sage's help, battle and eventually destroy the End at its full power, but at the apparent cost of Sage's life. However, after integrating the Ancients' technology with his own, Eggman is able to reawaken Sage's consciousness into his EggNet, to his relief.

Other games
Robotnik appears in Sonic Chaos, Triple Trouble, Blast and Pocket Adventure, as well as the 8-bit renditions of Sonic 1 and 2.

In Sonic Spinball, a pinball-themed game, Robotnik seizes Mount Mobius and turns it into a mechanical base called the "Veg-O-Fortress", setting up an elaborate pinball mechanism to keep the Chaos Emeralds safe. After the Veg-O-Machine is destroyed, Mount Mobius begins to crumble, and once the final boss is defeated, the doctor falls into the mountain which sinks into the ocean.

Robotnik has also appeared in "2.5D" isometric platformers; in Sonic Labyrinth, he secretly replaces Sonic's famous red shoes with the new "Slow-Down Boots," which take away his ability to jump or run fast, and in Sonic 3D Blast, he turns innocent Flickies into robots in yet another search for the Chaos Emeralds.

Robotnik/Eggman is also a playable character in such games as Sonic Drift, Drift 2, R, Riders as well as its sequels Zero Gravity, Free Riders, SEGA Superstars Tennis, Sonic & SEGA All-Stars Racing, and Sonic & All-Stars Racing Transformed and Team Sonic Racing. Eggman made a cameo appearance in Super Smash Bros. Brawl and 3DS/Wii U as a trophy. He appeared as a playable character in all of the Mario & Sonic titles, and as the 2 main villains (alongside Bowser) in the Adventure/Story Mode of Vancouver 2010 Winter Olympics for Nintendo DS, London 2012 Olympics for Nintendo 3DS, and Tokyo 2020 Olympics for Nintendo Switch. Eggman also appears in the crossover title Lego Dimensions, with Mike Pollock reprising his role as part of the level "Sonic Dimensions", in which he attempts to use the game's Keystone Devices to conquer multiple dimensions and defeat Sonic; a haunted parade balloon based on Eggman also appears as a boss in the game's Ghostbusters 2016 story pack's fourth level, "Breaking the Barrier".

The only game to feature Robotnik as the central character is the 1993 puzzle game Dr. Robotnik's Mean Bean Machine, in which Robotnik's Adventures of Sonic the Hedgehog's version, along with his numerous badnik bounty hunters seen in the first episode of the same show, attempts to rid all the fun and music on the planet Mobius by kidnapping the citizens of one insignificant town and turning them into robots. Despite the fact that he is the title character, he is still the villain and is the final boss.

Sonic and the Black Knight is the only game in the entire Sonic franchise series in which Eggman does not make a physical appearance or receive mention. However, the game makes small references to the character, including a collectible item bearing his emblem, an in-game mission featuring his robots as enemies, and unlockable fan art of the character.

He appears as a trophy in both Super Smash Bros. Brawl and Super Smash Bros. for Nintendo 3DS and Wii U, as well as a spirit in Super Smash Bros. Ultimate.

Eggman also appears in Sonic and the Secret Rings as Shahryār of Persia.

Eggman appeared in Sonic Rush and Rush Adventure, where he is once again the main antagonist, alongside a parallel version of himself called Eggman Nega. Eggman also appeared in Sonic Rivals 1 and 2, with Eggman Nega appearing as the main villain. Eggman is also a playable character in the Sonic RPG, Sonic Chronicles: The Dark Brotherhood.

In other media

Television
Doctor Eggman, under the "Robotnik" moniker, appeared as the main antagonist of two Sonic the Hedgehog animated television series that premiered in 1993. His appearance in the syndicated weekday series Adventures of Sonic the Hedgehog was designed by cartoonist Milton Knight, and his voice was provided by blues musician Long John Baldry. In the Saturday morning ABC series Sonic the Hedgehog, he was given the first name "Julian" and was voiced by Jim Cummings. Robotnik also served as the main antagonist of the 1999 series Sonic Underground, in which he is voiced by Garry Chalk.

In the 2-part episode Sonic the Hedgehog OVA, Robotnik (or "Eggman" in the original) tells Sonic that he has been banished from "Eggmanland" ("Robotropolis" in the ADV dub) by a metallic doppelgänger of himself called "Black Eggman" ("Metal Robotnik" in the ADV dub). It is later revealed that the mecha was piloted by Robotnik/Eggman himself, in a scheme to lure Sonic into his base and copy his DNA for his new Hyper Metal Sonic robot. Eggman/Robotnik was voiced by Junpei Takiguchi in the Japanese version and by Edwin Neal in the English dub.

In Sonic X, Dr. Eggman (which he is usually referred to as in this series, though his real last name in-universe is Robotnik as in the games), is as always the primary antagonist throughout Seasons 1 and 2. In the premiere episode, Eggman, alongside his lackey robots Deco, Boco, and Bokkun, having collected the Chaos Emeralds and kidnapped Cream the Rabbit for an unknown scheme, only for Sonic to confront him and damage his latest machine. The malfunctioning device induces an explosive domed variant of Chaos Control that accidentally transports Eggman, Sonic, and his friends, from their own world Mobius to Earth. Here, Eggman would instead endeavor to take over Earth instead, only to constantly be foiled by Sonic and Co., now joined by plucky human boy Chris Thorndyke and his family and friends. In the first season finale, Eggman once again collects In the second season, which adapts the events of Sonic Adventure, Sonic Adventure 2, and Sonic Battle, Eggman discovers the existence of the ancient watery entity Chaos and frees it, using the Emeralds to evolve it only to be betrayed by it, leaving Super Sonic to defeat and pacify it. Later on, Eggman discovers the Ultimate Lifeform, Project Shadow, hidden in a G.U.N. facility, revealed as a hedgehog resembling Sonic named Shadow. Eggman and Shadow find and reactivate a hidden space station known as the Space Colony ARK. Here, it is revealed that Professor Gerald Robotnik is his grandfather and that Earth was his homeworld, having at sometime in the past traveled to Mobius and sought to conquer it, leading to his ongoing conflict with Sonic and Co.. Eggman again tries to use the Chaos Emeralds to power the ARK's Eclipse Cannon in order to threaten the Earth into surrendering to his rule, only a failsafe put in place by a vengeful Gerald to activate and crash the ARK into the Earth and cause a mass extinction event, leading Shadow and Sonic to team up and destroy the BioLizard, the prototype Ultimate Lifeform who means to see Gerald's revenge through. In the final season, Eggman returns to Mobius with Sonic and friends with intent to resume his campaigns for conquering Mobius, only to reluctantly joins forces with Sonic and his friends to fight mechanical alien menace known as the Metarex. This incarnation is voiced by Chikao Ōtsuka in the Japanese version, and by Mike Pollock in the English dub.

Dr. Eggman appears as the primary antagonist of the Sonic Boom animated series, with Mike Pollock reprising his voice role. Eggman's physical appearance was the most drastically changed of the cast, now appearing to have a buff upper body and wearing a militaristic uniform, as well as having a fully brown and smoother mustache. He also appears to be less serious than his mainstream counterpart.

Dr. Eggman makes a handful of appearances in the anime Hi-sCoool! SeHa Girls. In the middle of the Sega Hard Girls' first exam in the game Border Break, Eggman hacks into the game world and begins to wreak havoc until Sonic appears. He leads Sonic and the girls on a chase through several Sonic the Hedgehog games until they finally defeat him using an invincibility power-up. He later appears in the final episode to wish the girls farewell at their graduation.

Dr. Eggman appears as the primary antagonist of the newest animated series Sonic Prime. Having tricked Sonic into breaking open a hidden catacomb in Green Hill Zone housing an ancient gemstone known as the Paradox Prism. After Sonic shatters the Prism, it results in the creation of multiple dimensions known as Shatterspaces with one being New Yoke City, a dystopian version of Green Hill ruled by the evil Chaos Council which is formed by five alternative versions of Eggman. The members are: the infant Dr. Babble, the lazy teenage Dr. Don't, the philosophic Dr. Deep, the elderly Dr. Done it and Mr. Dr. Eggman, the head of the council and the closest variant to the original Eggman. The council is the main antagonist of the series and intends to recover all of the Prism shards and conquer the Shatterverse. Brian Drummond voices Dr. Eggman, Mr. Dr. Eggman and Dr. Done it while Vincent Tong voices Dr. Babble, Dr. Don't and Dr. Deep.

Comics
When the first Sonic the Hedgehog title was released in 1991, Sega of America developed an origin for Sonic the Hedgehog and Dr. Robotnik which diverged from the back-stories created in Japan by Sonic Team. In this back-story, set on the planet Mobius, Dr. Ivo Robotnik was originally a benevolent scientist named Dr. Ovi Kintobor ("Ivo Robotnik" with each name spelled backwards; also, "ovi" is the Latin prefix meaning "egg"), a friend to Sonic who helped to develop the hedgehog's super-speed. Kintobor was transformed into Robotnik by a laboratory accident involving the Chaos Emeralds and a rotten egg, becoming his own evil opposite, who frequently used egg-related puns in his dialogue. This story was first featured in a 14-page promotional comic book published by Sega in the United States, written by Francis Mao, that was designed to promote the game, but would go on to greater fame in the United Kingdom, where it would be used by the vast majority of local publications, including the guidebook Stay Sonic, a series of novels from Virgin Books, and Fleetway Publications' Sonic the Comic, which was published from 1993 until 2002. In Sonic the Comic, Dr. Robotnik was dictator of planet Mobius for most of the comic's first 100 issues, while Sonic also had access to an AI computer program based on the personality of Dr. Kintobor. Initially, Robotnik's appearance in Sonic the Comic matched that of the video games, but from issue #22 onwards the comic adopted his design from the Adventures of Sonic the Hedgehog cartoon series.

Also, from 1993 to 2017, Archie Comics published a Sonic the Hedgehog comic book. The series is in a sense, a very loose continuation of ABC's Sonic the Hedgehog animated cartoon; as well as a mad scientist, Robotnik is a portrayed as a dictator who took control of Sonic's hometown during a coup d'etat. At the height of this conflict, Robotnik died during a final confrontation with Sonic, only later to be replaced by another Robotnik from a parallel world, becoming the same Dr. Eggman from the video games. In later years, the plot of the comic changed to incorporate elements from the video games, with Robotnik being replaced by his more traditional video game counterpart.

However, due to legal disputes with former writer Ken Penders, Archie Comics eventually cancelled the comic and ended their partnership with Sega. Sega later announced a partnership with IDW Publishing, intending to launch a brand new comic book, separate from the Archie comic. The IDW comic is depicted taking place after Sonic Forces, where Dr. Eggman had been flung into a village following his final battle with Sonic, having sustained amnesia as a result. Having become friendly and innovative, Eggman even reinforces the cell he was kept in. Deeming him a new man, the mayor releases him, where he takes up the name "Mr. Tinker", as their residential handyman. When Sonic finally locates him, he is skeptical of his nemesis' supposed change of heart, but after seeing Mr. Tinker protect the children from the Badnik horde, is convinced of his reformation, even defending him from Shadow the Hedgehog who planned to execute him. Mr. Tinker reveals that his new "Eggmanland" is simply a small amusement park for the children, and Sonic thus allows him to remain in the village. It's revealed that the mysterious figure directing the Eggman Empire is in fact his second in command Metal Sonic, who has been upgraded into his Neo form from Sonic Heroes once more. Neo Metal Sonic plans to retrieve Eggman so that he may resume command of his Empire, unaware of Mr. Tinker. The peace is short-lived as the upstart villain Dr. Starline finds Mr. Tinker and reawakens the Eggman persona. Eggman then proceeds with a plan to infect the world with a virus that converts organic matter into a robotic form. Quickly covering most of the planet, Eggman is unconcerned when it is discovered that his control over the new robotic life forms has become less effective, prompting Starline to betray him by summoning the Deadly Six. Eggman ultimately teams up with Sonic to defeat Zavok and neutralize the Metal Virus.

Film
Eggman appears in the 2012 Disney movie Wreck-It Ralph, where the film is set in an arcade and depicts many video game characters living inside the arcade machines. In the movie itself, Eggman appears in his current design from the "Modern" Sonic games, both in person as a member of the villain support group "Bad-Anon", and as a caricature picture on the Celebrity Wall of Tapper's, a bar located inside the arcade machine of Tapper. In the ending credits of the film, he appears in a brief pixel-art styled scene, using his in-game design from Sonic the Hedgehog 3. Eggman also makes a cameo appearance in the sequel, Ralph Breaks the Internet.

Robotnik/Eggman appears in the theatrical Sonic the Hedgehog film released by Paramount Pictures in 2020, with Jim Carrey portraying a live-action version of the character. In the film, he is referred to almost exclusively as Robotnik, and is depicted as a twisted scientist hired by the United States Department of Defense to hunt down Sonic after he caused a power outage across the Pacific Northwest. Eventually, he receives the moniker "Eggman" from Sonic after the egg-shaped designs of his robots. Robotnik uses one of Sonic's quills to power up his machines to match Sonic's speed, but is eventually defeated by Sonic. He is transported to a planet filled with mushrooms, and after being trapped there for 87 days, he shaves his head and grows out his moustache, making him further resemble his in-game appearances, as he plots his revenge against Sonic. 

In the second film, Robotnik spent 243 days (nearly a year) on the mushroom planet until he teams up with Knuckles to destroy Sonic and locate the Master Emerald. Robotnik eventually betrays Knuckles and absorbs the Master Emerald, intending to conquer the universe with it. In Green Hills, he uses his new powers to create a giant robotic replica of himself (which resembles the Death Egg Robot from the games), but is defeated after Knuckles knocks the Master Emerald out of him and Sonic uses the Chaos Emeralds to transform into Super Sonic and destroy the robot. Robotnik's whereabouts and living status are unknown by the end of the film. 
Although not said on screen, the full name of the character as written in the movie's novelization is listed as "Ivo Gerald Robotnik." The middle name of which is a moniker to his grandfather.

Reception and legacy
Reception to the character has been very positive, with Dr. Robotnik going on to become one of the most well-known villains in gaming. GameDaily ranked him number one on their list of Top 25 Evil Masterminds of All Time article, stating "Out of all the evil masterminds in video games, none are more despicable, more cunning, or more menacing". They also included him in their most persistent video game villains list and their craziest video game villains list. In a later article, they listed the "evil mastermind" as one of the top 25 video game archetypes, using Robotnik as an example. He was featured at number three in a "Reader's Choice" edition of GameSpot's "Top Ten Video Game Villains" article, which noted a massive complaint by fans at his exclusion from the original list. Eggman was also named the 15th most diabolical video game villain of all time by PC World. Game Informer notes that in Sonic Chronicles: The Dark Brotherhood, "Eggman's villain ego shows some amusing tarnish after constant defeat at the hands of Sonic." IGN listed him at number nine above Mario-series villain Bowser in their "Top 10 Most Memorable Villains" article, calling him "PETA's videogame public enemy number one", and has also commented that his character is a "pretty clever riff on Teddy Roosevelt" that has added to the attraction of the series. Guinness World Records Gamer's Edition listed Dr. Eggman as 43rd in their list of "top 50 video game villains". In 2010, IGN listed Dr. Robotnik 11th out of their "Top 100 Videogame Villains". Nintendo Power listed Dr. Robotnik as their seventh favorite villain, also listing him as having one of the best mustaches. Nathan Rohe, writing for Odyssey considers him the best video game villain of all-time, reasoning "...he often strikes that perfect balance between silly and sinister. Eggman is often depicted as a bumbling buffoon who gets beaten time and time again by a teenage blue hedgehog and his friends. However, when you actually look at his plans they can be quite vile."

A macrocyclic molecule discovered by a Harvard University research team to potentially inhibit the protein Sonic hedgehog was named "Robotnikinin" after the Dr. Robotnik character. The researchers felt that after Sonic hedgehog was named after the Sega video game character, they should "adhere to the convention" in naming the inhibiting compound after the character's archenemy.

The band Intercontinental Music Lab included a song about Dr. Robotnik on their 2008 album, Superheroes of Science. The power metal band Powerglove wrote a song called "So Sexy Robotnik" based on the boss theme from Sonic the Hedgehog 2 and features snips from various other level tunes from the same game. It appears as the first track on their 2007 album "Metal Kombat for the Mortal Man".

See also

List of Sonic the Hedgehog characters

Notes

References

External links
 
 Doctor Eggman at Sonic-City (archived)
 Doctor Eggman at Sonic Channel 

Animated human characters
Villains in animated television series
Dictator characters in video games
Fictional criminals in video games
Fictional roboticists
Fictional mad scientists
Fictional mechanics
Fictional kidnappers
Fictional inventors in video games
Fictional terrorists
Fictional United States government agents
Fictional private military members
Fictional war veterans
Mad scientist characters in video games
Male characters in video games
Sega antagonists
Sonic the Hedgehog characters
Male video game villains
Video game bosses
Video game characters based on real people
Video game characters introduced in 1991
Male film villains
Film supervillains
Video game characters
Eggs in culture
Fictional misers
Fictional gentleman thieves
Fictional gentleman detectives
Fictional tricksters
Fictional con artists